Nikhilananda Sar (born 30 July 1936) is an Indian politician for the Burdwan (Lok Sabha constituency) in West Bengal.

External links
 Official biographical sketch in Parliament of India website

1936 births
Communist Party of India (Marxist) politicians from West Bengal
People from Bardhaman
Living people
India MPs 2004–2009
Lok Sabha members from West Bengal
India MPs 1998–1999
India MPs 1999–2004